Revival is a far-right and ultranationalist political party in Bulgaria, founded in August 2014.  Its chairman is Kostadin Kostadinov. The party is defined by various analysts and media as anti-EU, anti-NATO, anti-American, pro-Russian, and being opposed to COVID-19 vaccinations and spreading anti-vaccine rhetoric.

History 
In June 2014, Kostadin Kostadinov told media that on 2 August in the same year, in the city of Pliska there would be held a Constituent Assembly which was to create the party "Revival". The initiators choose the day that is the celebrated anniversary of the Ilinden Uprising. Kostadinov founded the party after he became unhappy following Krasimir Karakachanov's reelection as leader of IMRO-BNM in 2012. 

The party entered the Bulgarian parliament after the 2021 general election, gaining 13 seats. A member of Revival's parliamentary group left them in June 2022.

The party has promoted conspiracy theories regarding COVID-19 and had strong reservations regarding COVID-19 vaccines.

Leadership 
Kostadin Kostadinov – Chairman 
Velislav Hristov – Vice chairman
Petar Petrov – Vice chairman
Tsoncho Ganev – Vice chairman
Nikolay Drenchev – Secretary

Election results

National Assembly elections

European Parliament elections

See also 
List of political parties in Bulgaria

References

External links 
 

Bulgarian nationalism
Nationalist parties in Bulgaria
Right-wing populism in Bulgaria
Right-wing populist parties
Anti-Islam political parties in Europe
Eurosceptic parties in Bulgaria
Conservative parties in Bulgaria
2014 establishments in Bulgaria
Political parties established in 2014
Far-right parties in Europe
Opposition to NATO
COVID-19 misinformation
Vaccine hesitancy
Organizations that oppose LGBT rights